Ahunstic station is a commuter rail station operated by Exo in the borough of Ahuntsic-Cartierville, in Montreal, Quebec, Canada. It is served by the Mascouche line.

Overview
The station is located just north of Marché Central. It was built on an existing CN railroad bridge over Boulevard de l'Acadie, which also underwent partial reconstruction and structural reinforcement. Although it is located relatively close to Chabanel station on the Saint-Jérôme line, they are not considered a transfer site. 

Two tracks pass through the station, but only the southern track is used by passengers, with a single low-level side platform. The platform is wheelchair accessible and features a raised wheelchair platform with a ramp to provide access to the trains. A shorter emergency exit platform is located on the north side.

The station has one headhouse, located on the northeastern side of Boulevard de l'Acadie. It provides stair and elevator access from the street. Across Boulevard de l'Acadie is a secondary access with exterior stairs 

Two untitled murals by Sylvain Bouthillette are located outside the headhouse.

The station marked the transition between the electrified and non-electrified portions of the Mascouche line. Exo's ALP-45DP dual-mode electro-diesel locomotives transitioned from electric to diesel mode as they continued north along the line.

Future
As of May 2020, most trips on the Mascouche line terminate at Ahuntsic due to the ongoing conversion of the Deux-Montagnes line into the mainline of the Réseau express métropolitain (REM) rapid transit system. Once the REM mainline is completed sometime in late 2024, a new station called  will open, expressly designed to ensure smooth transfer of users between the Mascouche line and the REM, and replacing Ahuntsic station as the line's new terminus.

Connecting bus routes

References

External links
 Ahuntsic Commuter Train Station Information (RTM)
 Ahuntsic Commuter Train Station Schedule (RTM)
 2016 STM System Map

Exo commuter rail stations
Railway stations in Montreal
Ahuntsic-Cartierville